Brørup is a railway town, with a population of 4,516 (1 January 2022), in Vejen Municipality, Region of Southern Denmark in Denmark.

Until 1 January 2007 Brørup was the seat of the former Brørup Municipality (Danish, kommune) in Ribe County.

Transport

Brørup is served by Brørup station, located on the Lunderskov-Esbjerg railway line.

Brørup Municipality

The former Brørup Municipality covered an area of 107 km2, and had a total population of 6,485 (2005).  Its last mayor was Egon Fræhr, a member of the Venstre (Liberal Party) political party.

Brørup municipality ceased to exist as the result of Kommunalreformen ("The Municipality Reform" of 2007). It was merged with existing Holsted, Rødding, and Vejen municipalities to form the new Vejen municipality. This created a municipality with an area of 817 km2 and a total population of 41,350 (2005).

Notable people 
 Peter Graulund (born 1976 in Brørup) a retired Danish professional football player, over 100 Danish Superliga goals
 Christian Keller (born 1980 in Brørup) a retired Danish professional football player, over 400 club caps
 Mads Conrad-Petersen (born 1988 in Brørup) a Danish badminton player

International relations

Twin towns — Sister cities

Brørup is twinned with:

  Brodnica, Poland

See also
Tirslund Rock

References

 Municipal statistics: NetBorger Kommunefakta, delivered from KMD aka Kommunedata (Municipal Data)
 Municipal mergers and neighbors: Eniro new municipalities map

External links
 Vejen municipality's official website 
 Brørup municipality's OLD official website (now just a short statement) 

Cities and towns in the Region of Southern Denmark
Former municipalities of Denmark
Vejen Municipality